The 2018 Tour des Fjords was the sixth edition of the Tour des Fjords road cycling stage race.

Teams
Twenty-one teams started the race. Each team had a maximum of six riders:

Route

Stages

Stage 1

Stage 2

Stage 3

Results

References

External links

2018
2018 in Norwegian sport
2018 UCI Europe Tour